Romuald Bourque (6 December 1889 – 14 August 1974) was a Quebec businessman and political figure. He represented Outremont—Saint-Jean in the House of Commons of Canada as a Liberal member from 1952 to 1963. Bourque was a member of the Senate of Canada for De la Vallière division from 1963 to 1974.

He was born in Ottawa, Ontario in 1889, the son of François Bourque. He apprenticed as a printer there and then went to Montreal where he worked for the Montreal Herald. In 1920, he founded the newspaper Le Nouvelliste at Trois-Rivières. In 1926, he became sales manager for the Cie Mercury Press Limited at Montreal, becoming vice-president in 1930. Bourque was also mayor of Outremont from 1949 to 1964. He was named to the Senate in 1963, died in office in 1974 and was buried in the Notre Dame des Neiges Cemetery.

His brother, E. A. Bourque, was mayor of Ottawa in 1949 and 1950.

His great-nephew Pierre Bourque was Alderman, City of Ottawa, and Councillor, Regional Municipality of Ottawa-Carleton in 1991.

References 

 
 Article from L’Encyclopédie de l’histoire du Québec

1889 births
1974 deaths
Businesspeople from Ottawa
Canadian senators from Quebec
Liberal Party of Canada MPs
Liberal Party of Canada senators
Mayors of places in Quebec
Members of the House of Commons of Canada from Quebec
Burials at Notre Dame des Neiges Cemetery
Politicians from Ottawa